Fundamento de Esperanto (English: Foundation of Esperanto) is a 1905 book by L. L. Zamenhof, in which the author explains the basic grammar rules and vocabulary that constitute the basis of the constructed language Esperanto. On August 9, 1905, it  was made the only obligatory authority over the language by the Declaration of Boulogne at the first World Esperanto Congress. Much of the content of the book is a reproduction of content from Zamenhof's earlier works, particularly Unua Libro.

Content
Fundamento de Esperanto consists of four parts: a foreword, a grammar section, a collection of exercises, and a dictionary. With the exception of the foreword, almost everything in the Fundamento comes directly from Zamenhof's earlier works, primarily Unua Libro. Esperanto, however, underwent a minor change in 1888 in Aldono al la Dua Libro, in which Zamenhof changed the ending of the temporal correlatives (when, then, always, sometimes, never) from -ian to -iam, so the Esperanto of the Fundamento is slightly different than that of Unua Libro.

The grammar and dictionary sections of the Fundamento are in five national languages: French, English, German, Russian, and Polish.

Declaration of Boulogne
Fundamento de Esperanto was made the official source of Esperanto in the fourth article of the Declaration of Boulogne at the first World Esperanto Congress in Boulogne-sur-Mer, France:

Equal to the Fundamento are the Oficialaj Aldonoj (Official Additions). To date, there have been nine Official Additions. The foreword of the Fundamento states:
{{quotation|Some time from now, when many of the new words have completely stabilized, some authoritative institution shall put them into an official dictionary, as 'Additions to the Fundamento'''.}}

That authoritative institution is the Akademio de Esperanto.

References

External links

 A web-based version of the Fundamento de Esperanto, Akademio de Esperanto
 The original print Fundamento.
 A detailed commentary on the Fundamento, Berlina Komentario, 2 vol. 2014, 650 pp. (in Esperanto).
 A collection of free Esperanto books compiled by David G. Simpson. This collection includes, among many others, reprints of the "canonical books" of the Esperanto language; i.e. Unua Libro, Dua Libro (with the Aldono al la Dua Libro) and Fundamento de Esperanto.
 La Fundamento Centjara 2, Carlo Minnaja (in Esperanto).
(eo) Praktika Fundamento de Esperanto, L.L. Zamenhof, Lerniloj, vortaro, FEL'', 2020.

Esperanto history
Esperanto literature
1905 non-fiction books